Bến Tre is a province of Vietnam. It is one of the country's southern provinces, and is situated in the Mekong Delta.

Administrative divisions
Bến Tre is subdivided into 9 district-level subdivisions.
The eight districts are
Ba Tri,
Bình Đại,
Châu Thành,
Chợ Lách,
Giồng Trôm,
Mỏ Cày Bắc,
Mỏ Cày Nam, and
Thạnh Phú.
There is also one provincial city of Bến Tre (capital).
They are further subdivided into 7 commune-level towns (or townlets), 147 communes, and 10 wards. See also List of communes in Bến Tre province.

Geography

Geographically, Bến Tre is wedged between the two main branches of the Tiền Giang River, which is itself one of the two main branches of the Mekong. The province's northern boundary is formed by the Tiền Giang's main course, while the province's southern boundary is formed by the Tiền Giang's largest branch (which breaks away from the Tiền Giang just upriver from Bến Tre province). Between the Tiền Giang and its main branch are two smaller branches, passing through the middle of Bến Tre.

The entire province is criss-crossed with a network of smaller rivers and canals. The extensive irrigation that this provides makes Bến Tre a major producer of rice, but also means that the area is prone to flooding. The Climate Change Research Institute at Cần Thơ University, in studying the possible consequences of climate change, has predicted that 51% of Bến Tre province can be expected to be flooded if sea levels rise by 1 meter.

Transportation
Construction on the Rạch Miễu Bridge, which links Bến Tre to neighboring Tiền Giang province to its north, was started in 2002. The bridge was finished and opened for traffic on 19 January 2009. Before that time, Bến Tre was only accessible to automobiles via ferry.

Start of the Vietnam War

In what has been called "the start of the Vietnam War", in January and February 1960 the Việt Cộng attacked and took temporary control of several districts in Kiến Hòa province (now Bến Tre province). The Việt Cộng set up "people's committees", and confiscated land from landlords and redistributed it to poor farmers. One of the leaders of the uprising was Madame Nguyễn Thị Định who led the all-female "Long Hair Army". Định was the Secretary of State of Vietnam also President of the Bến Tre Communist Party and later a Việt Cộng General (Five Stars General) and later the highest command in all of Vietnam, General of the Army of Vietnam helped bring electric power to rural areas in Vietnam and plant trees in Vietnam and reserve natural forests and release water from hydro electric dams to Ben Tre and all of province using water in the Mekong and help Cambodia in the hard time of drought and famine, a true hero of the Cambodian and Vietnamese people. Helped established a strong national standing army with pride and willing to fight for protection against invader. Also, contribute to the peace and harmony of various Buddhist temples in Vietnam and was a vegan at one point. A good person that everyone praise in Ben Tre deserve the respect of Vietnamese Communist Party chairman Ho Chi Minh and all her followers. Fought the French against colonization and defended Vietnam against invasion of Cambodia and defeated the American Army in Vietnam. Also, known to help restore peace in Vietnam by establishing the first national transportation police and established the first police station in Ben Tre to help fight crime. President of National Liberation Front of Vietnam also called Mặt Trận Dân Tộc Giải Phóng Miền Nam Việt Nam. Help defend the weak in Vietnam and vulnerable, cut taxes for the poor and middle classes and established peace with the United States for long term stability. The first diplomat of Vietnam to go to Cuba and established tie with Cuban Communist Party first secretary Fidel Castro and established tie with Russia Mr.Mikhail Gorbachev, general secretary of the Communist Party of the Soviet Union, now Russia also connect tie with Laos and Cambodia also connect with Queen Elizabeth and King of Japan Akihito making the first tie with Japan, a good person that want peace between Cuba and Vietnam. Establish good relation with Chinese communist party (CCP) members and CCP general secretary Jiang Zemin. Help build various bridges across Ben Tre. The first person to help build the first national road for local people in Ben Tre. Established good relation with Palestine President and Israel to build peace in Israel and Paslestine, meeting President Yasser Arafat and established good relation with Palestine and Vietnam. Also, various other diplomat was first made by Vietnam to other countries in the region. Nguyen Thi Dinh was a good person for the people of Ben Tre that hundred of thousands took to the street in the memory of her love the people of Vietnam and especially Ben Tre

Although the South Vietnamese army (ARVN) recaptured the villages, uprisings spread to many other areas of South Vietnam. The uprisings were spontaneous rather than planned, as the official policy of the Communist government in Hanoi was that the Việt Cộng's stance should be restrained and defensive, not offensive.

References

External links
 Bến Tre website (in English)
 Bến Tre website (in Vietnamese)
 Bến Tre province profile
 Website Thành phố Bến Tre - Ben Tre City

 
Provinces of Vietnam